Meriania versicolor is a species of plant in the family Melastomataceae. It is endemic to Colombia.

References

versicolor
Endemic flora of Colombia
Taxonomy articles created by Polbot

Endangered flora of South America